The American Society for Bioethics and Humanities is an American learned society dedicated to promoting research and the exchange of ideas in bioethics and related disciplines in the humanities. It was founded in January 1998 from the merger between the Society for Health and Human Values (SHHV), the Society for Bioethics Consultation (SBC), and the American Association of Bioethics (AAB), which were founded in 1969, 1986, and 1994, respectively.

Presidents
 Kayhan Parsi, JD PHD HEC-C (President-Elect, to serve from 2021 to 2023)
 Ana Smith Iltis
 Alex Kon (2017–2019)
 Amy Haddad (2015–17)
 Felicia Cohn (2013–15)
 Joseph Fins (2011–13)
 Mark Kuczewski (2009–11)
 Hilde Lindemann (2008–09)
 Tod S. Chambers (2007–08)
 Paul Root Wolpe (2006–07)
 Matthew K. Wynia (2005–06)
 Arthur R. Derse (2004–05)
 Jonathan D. Moreno (2003–04)
 John D. Lantos (2002–03)
 Kathryn Montgomery (2001–02)
 Laurie Zoloth (2000–01)
 Thomas H. Murray (1999-2000)
 Mary Faith Marshall (1998–99)
 Loretta M. Kopelman (1998)

Lifetime Achievement Award
 2019 - Christine Grady, PhD RN
 2018 - Dan W. Brock, PhD
 2017 - Myra Christopher and Steven H. Miles, MD
 2016 - Arthur Caplan, PhD
 2015 - Baruch Brody, PhD
 2014 - Nancy Dubler, LLB
 2013 - H. Tristram Engelhardt Jr., MD PhD
 2012 - Kathryn Montgomery, PhD
 2011 - Ruth Faden, PhD MPH
 2010 - Mark Siegler, MD
 2009 - Howard Brody, MD PhD
 2008 - Robert M. Veatch, PhD
 2007 - Renée C. Fox, PhD
 2006 - Ronald E. Cranford, MD and Bernard Gert, PhD
 2005 - Eric Cassell, MD MACP
 2004 - Tom L. Beauchamp, PhD, James F. Childress, PhD, and Joanne Trautmann Banks, PhD
 2003 - Jay Katz, MD
 2002 - Ruth Macklin, PhD
 2001 - Daniel Callahan, PhD
 2000 - John C. Fletcher, PhD
 1999 - Albert R. Jonsen, PhD
 1998 - Edmund D. Pellegrino, MD

References

External links
 

Learned societies of the United States
Bioethics research organizations
Organizations established in 1998
Organizations based in Chicago